Diane Gilman may refer to:
 Diane Gilman (environmentalist)
 Diane Gilman (clothing designer)